Monortha procera is a species of moth of the family Tortricidae. It is found in Ecuador.

The wingspan is about 17.5 mm. The ground colour of the forewings is pale ochreous brownish, but more olive brown distally. There are some creamy dots along the dorsum and the costa is spotted brown. The markings are ochreous brownish with a slight olive hue and browner edges. The hindwings are grey brown.

Etymology
The specific name refers to the shape of the uncus and is derived from procera (meaning long).

References

Moths described in 2004
Monortha